Walter F. Boron (born November 18, 1949) is an American scientist and the 72nd president of the American Physiological Society (from 1999 to 2000). He is currently secretary-general of the International Union of Physiological Sciences. Additionally, Boron is co-editor, along with Emile L. Boulpaep, of the textbook Medical Physiology and former editor-in-chief of two leading physiology journals, Physiological Reviews and Physiology.

Career
Boron is the David N. and Inez Myers/Antonio Scarpa Professor and chairman of the Department of Physiology and Biophysics at Case Western Reserve University. From 1980-2007, he was a member of the faculty of Yale University.

Boron's lifelong research interest has been acid-base homeostasis. With his colleagues, he was the first to demonstrate cell-pH regulation, discovered and cloned several bicarbonate transporters, elucidated the sensing of molecular carbon dioxide and bicarbonate, and introduced several experimental paradigms for studying cellular acid-base physiology.

More recently, following the initial descriptions of a membrane that is impermeable to gases and a channel that is permeable to gases, Boron's group has extended its interest to understanding mechanisms of gas movement through aquaporins and Rh proteins, and the physiological significance of this movement.

Education
Boron obtained his undergraduate degree in chemistry at Saint Louis University in 1971. He studied medicine at Washington University School of Medicine, where he received his M.D. and Ph.D. degrees in 1977 under the mentorship of Albert Roos. During this time, Boron also collaborated with Paul De Weer and John Russell. Boron joined Yale University as a postdoctoral fellow with Emile L. Boulpaep in 1978.

Books
 Medical Physiology Walter F. Boron. 1st Edition (2002) 
 Medical Physiology Walter F. Boron, Emile L. Boulpaep. 2nd Edition (2008) 
 Medical Physiology Walter F. Boron, Emile L. Boulpaep. 3rd Edition (2016)

References

Further reading

1949 births
Living people
Washington University School of Medicine alumni
Case Western Reserve University faculty
Yale University faculty
Saint Louis University alumni
Members of the National Academy of Medicine
Yale University fellows